Ransomes is the common name for the Ransomes, Sims & Jefferies an engineering business of Orwell Works, Ipswich.It may also refer to several other associated organisations or locations:
Ransome & Marles, Newark-on-Trent and their brass band
Ransomes & Rapier of Waterside Works, Ipswich
Ransomes and Reavell Sports Club Ground, Ipswich
Ransomes Industrial Estate, Ipswich
Ransomes, Sims & Jefferies, an engineering business of Orwell Works, Ipswich
Ransomes Sports F.C., Ransomes and Reavell Sports Club Ground, Ipswich

Former names for the business of Ransomes, Sims and Jefferies include:
(partnerships)
 1789 Robert Ransome.
 1809 Ransome & Son. 
 1818 Ransome & Sons. 
 1823 J & R Ransome.
 1830 J R and A Ransome.
 1846 Ransomes & May. added Charles May
 1852 Ransomes & Sims. added William Dillwyn Sims
 1869 Ransomes, Sims & Head. added John Head
 1881 Ransomes, Sims & Jefferies. added John Robert Jefferies
(Incorporated limited liability joint-stock company)
 1884 Ransomes, Sims & Jefferies Limited
 1911 Public listed company Ransomes, Sims & Jefferies Limited